Central office multiplexing (or CO muxing) is telephone exchange (central office) equipment that derives a number of lower-speed channels from one high-bandwidth channel.  This type of multiplexing is needed when the customer wants to terminate the DS1 or DS3 in the central office and wants to ‘pick up’ lower level services. For example, a customer may order a DS3, using it to carry a number of DS1 level services from different IXC carriers.

Telephone exchange equipment